The Ministry of Territorial Development and Habitat (MDTyH) of Argentina is a ministry of the national executive power that oversees and defines the Argentine state's policies on housing and habitat.

The ministry was created in 2019, as one of the initial measures of President Alberto Fernández, elevating the housing and territorial development areas of the Ministry of the Interior, Public Works and Housing. The current minister is Santiago Maggiotti, of the Justicialist Party, since November 2022.

Attributions
The attributions and responsibilities of the Ministry of Territorial Development and Habitat are specified in Article 23 decies of the current Law of Ministries (Ley de Ministerios), published in 2019. This law states that the ministry exists since housing is a right, as well as a necessity for the wellbeing of the population. In this vein, the Ministry is in charge of intervening in the elaboration of public policy oriented towards the development of habitat, housing and socio-urban integration, whilst attending to the diversities, demands and ways of inhabiting that manifest across the territory of Argentina.

Structure and dependencies
The Ministry of Territorial Development and Habitat counts with a number of centralized dependencies reporting to  it. The centralized dependencies, as in other government ministers, are known as secretariats (secretarías) and undersecretariats (subsecretarías); there are currently four of these:

Secretariat of Habitat (Secretaría de Hábitat)
Undersecretariat of Housing Policies and Infrastructure
Secretariat of Socio-urban Integration (Secretaría de Integración Socio-Urbana)
Undersecretariat of Neighbourhood Lands and Services Administration
Secretariat of Territorial Development (Secretaría de Desarrollo Territorial)
Undersecretariat of Land Policy and Urbanism (Subecretaría de Política de Suelo y Urbanismo)
Secretariat of Coordination (Secretaría de Coordinación)
Administrative Undersecretariat (Subsecretaría Administrativa)
Legal Undersecretariat (Subsecretaría Legal)

No decentralized agencies currently report to the Ministry of Territorial Development and Habitat.

Headquarters
The Ministry of Territorial Development and Habitat is headquartered in the eighth floor of the YPF Building (address Esmeralda 255), located in the Monserrat barrio in Buenos Aires. The office building, completed in 1938, was originally designed to be the headquarters of Yacimientos Petrolíferos Fiscales (YPF), which it was until 2008 when it moved to its current offices in Puerto Madero.

List of ministers

References

External links
 

Territorial Development and Housing
Argentina
Argentina
Argentina
2019 establishments in Argentina
Presidency of Alberto Fernández